Michael Gedaliah Kammen (October 25, 1936 – November 29, 2013) was an American professor of American cultural history in the Department of History at Cornell University. At the time of his death, he held the title "Newton C. Farr professor emeritus of American history and culture".

Kammen was born in 1936 in Rochester, New York, grew up in the Washington, D.C., area, and was educated at the George Washington University and Harvard University, where he received his Ph.D. in 1964 after studying under Bernard Bailyn. He began teaching at Cornell upon completion his graduate studies at Harvard and taught until retiring to emeritus status in 2008. Beginning as a scholar of the colonial period of American history, his interests eventually broadened to include American legal, cultural, and social issues of the 19th and 20th centuries.

One of his first major books, People of Paradox: An Inquiry Concerning the Origins of American Civilization,  won the Pulitzer Prize for History in 1973. A later work, A Machine That Would Go of Itself: The Constitution in American Culture (1986),  won the Francis Parkman Prize and the Henry Adams Prize.  In this work, Kammen describes the American people's evolving conceptions of the U.S. Constitution and of constitutional governance, stressing both mechanical and organic conceptions of constitutional development over time.

Kammen was active in organizations advancing the study of history, and served as president of the Organization of American Historians for the 1995-96 year.

He was the father of UC Berkeley professor Daniel Kammen.

Major works

 People of Paradox: An Inquiry Concerning the Origins of American Civilization (1973)
 Colonial New York: A History. Millwood, NJ: K+O Press, 1975. 
 The Origins of the American Constitution: A Documentary History. New York: Penguin Books, 1986.  (edited by Kammen)
 A Machine That Would Go of Itself: The Constitution in American Culture (1986)
 A Season of Youth: The American Revolution in the Historical Imagination (1988)
 Mystic Chords of Memory: The Transformation of Tradition in American Culture (1991)
 Contested Values: Democracy and Diversity in American Culture (1995)
 In The Past Lane: Historical Perspectives on American Culture (1997)
 American Culture, American Tastes: Social Change and the 20th Century (1999)
 A Time to Every Purpose: The Four Seasons in American Culture (2004)
 Digging Up the Dead: A History of Notable American Reburials (2010)

References

External links 
 Michael Kammen faculty page
 

Booknotes interview with Kammen on American Culture, American Tastes: Social Change and the 20th Century, October 24, 1999.
 Michael G. Kammen at Library of Congress Authorities — with 52 catalog records
 Segelken, H. Roger. "American historian Michael G. Kammen dies at 77."  Cornell Chronicle, Dec. 2, 2013
New York Times obituary
Washington post obituary

American historians
Cornell University Department of History faculty
History of the Thirteen Colonies
Historians of the United States
Pulitzer Prize for History winners
George Washington University alumni
Harvard University alumni
1936 births
2013 deaths